Cecil Caldwell (born February 27, 1977) is a former Arena Football League offensive lineman/defensive lineman. He has played for the Los Angeles Avengers, the Orlando Predators, and the Grand Rapids Rampage, and the Philadelphia Soul.

College career
Caldwell attended the University of South Carolina, and finished his college career with 14.5 sacks and 189 tackles. As a senior, he was also voted a team captain.

External links
Stats from arenafan.com
Newberry High School "Where Are They Now?" writeup

1977 births
Living people
People from Newberry, South Carolina
American football offensive linemen
American football defensive linemen
South Carolina Gamecocks football players
Los Angeles Avengers players
Orlando Predators players
Grand Rapids Rampage players
Philadelphia Soul players